Edward Prideaux (23 March 1864 – 3 April 1948) was a New Zealand cricketer. He played in one first-class match for Wellington in 1885/86.

See also
 List of Wellington representative cricketers

References

External links
 

1864 births
1948 deaths
New Zealand cricketers
Wellington cricketers
Cricketers from Wellington City